The Convention Concerning the Prohibition and Immediate Action for the Elimination of the Worst Forms of Child Labour, known in short as the Worst Forms of Child Labour Convention, was adopted by the International Labour Organization (ILO) in 1999 as ILO Convention No 182. It is one of eight ILO fundamental conventions.

By ratifying this Convention No. 182, a country commits itself to taking immediate action to prohibit and eliminate the worst forms of child labour, including slavery, child prostitution, use of children in criminal activities, and dangerous labour. The Convention is enjoying the fastest pace of ratifications in the ILO's history since 1919.

The ILO's International Programme on the Elimination of Child Labour (IPEC) is responsible for assisting countries in this regard as well as monitoring compliance. One of the methods used by IPEC to assist countries in this regard are Time-bound Programmes.

The ILO also adopted the Worst Forms of Child Labour Recommendation No 190 in 1999. This recommendation contains, among others, recommendations on the types of hazards that should be considered for inclusion within a country-based definition of Worst Forms of Hazards faced by Children at Work.

Convention No 182 has been signed by all ILO Member States by 4 August 2020. This has become the fastest ratified agreement in the UN's 101-year history.

Purpose of the Convention 
The elimination of child labour was one of the main goals of the ILO. According to the UN agency, 152 million children worldwide are affected by the convention, almost half of which do dangerous work. Most child labour is carried out in the agricultural sector, mainly due to poverty and the difficulties faced by parents. The Convention supports the prohibition and elimination of the worst forms of child labour, including slavery, forced labour and trafficking in human beings. It prohibits the use of children in armed conflicts, prostitution and pornography, illegal activities such as drug trafficking and dangerous work. According to the ILO, the proportion of child labour fell by almost 40 percent between 2000 and 2016 as the ratification rate increased and countries passed laws and policies, including the minimum age of employment.

Ratifications

This is a historic event as it is the first time for an International Labor Convention to be ratified by all member states.

The convention has also not been extended to several non-metropolitan territories of states that ratified the convention:

Predefined worst forms of child labour
Article 3 of the International Labor Organization's Convention 182 includes forms of child labour, which are predefined as the worst forms of child labour, including the following:. They are also sometimes referred to as automatic worst forms of child labour.

The predefined worst forms of child labour are:
all forms of slavery or practices similar to slavery, such as
the sale of a child;
trafficking of children, meaning the recruitment of children to do work far away from home and from the care of their families, in circumstances within which they are exploited;
debt bondage or any other form of bonded labour or serfdom;
forced or compulsory labour, including forced or compulsory recruitment of children for use in armed conflict;
Commercial sexual exploitation of children (CSEC), including the use, procuring or offering of a child for:
prostitution, or
the production of pornography or for pornographic performances;
use, procuring or offering of a child by others for illegal activities, also known as children used by adults in the commission of crime (CUBAC), including the trafficking or production of drugs
work by its nature that is likely to harm the health, safety or morals of children

Worst form hazards: To be defined by each ratifying country
The last category of worst form of child labour is work which by its nature or the circumstances is likely to harm the health, safety or morals of children, or Worst Forms of Hazards faced by Children at Work. Here the Convention recommended that the circumstances should be determined in consultation with organisations of employers and workers within a specific country. The Convention recommends that programmes of action should attend specifically to younger children, the girl child, hidden work situation in which girls are at special risk, and other groups of children with special vulnerabilities or needs. Worst Forms of Child Labour Recommendation No 190 contains recommendations on the types of hazards that should be considered to be included within a country-based definition of worst form hazards. This could lead to many deaths.

The worst forms of child labour that should be prohibited in ILO Recommendation No. 190 are:

 "Any work that exposes children to sexual abuse (physically or psychologically).
 Any work that is done underground, under water, at dangerous heights or in confined spaces.
 Any work that is done with dangerous machinery, equipment and tools.
 Any work that involves the manual handling or transport of heavy loads.
 Any work that is done in an unhealthy environment which may, for example, expose children to hazardous substances, agents or processes, or to temperatures, noise levels, or vibrations damaging to their health.
 Any work that is done under particularly difficult conditions such as work for long hours or during the night or work where the child is unreasonably confined to the premises of the employer."

Country programmes on WFCL
Several programs exist (coordinated by the ILO or other UN organisations) to stimulate adherence to the convention:
Programmes of the International Labour Organization addressing the worst forms of child labour
Time-Bound Programmes for the Eradication of the Worst forms of Child Labour;
International Programme on the Elimination of Child Labour;
Country programmes on Commercial sexual exploitation of children.
The Special Rapporteur on the sale of children, child prostitution and child pornography plays a role in the co-ordination of activities.

References

External links
Text of the Convention and Recommendation No 190
ratifications
Handbook for parliamentarians: Eliminating the worst forms of child labour ILO, Inter-Parliamentary Union, 2002
ILO Further documents on Worst Form Hazards
Findings on the Worst Forms of Child Labor - U.S. Department of Labor

Child labour treaties
International Labour Organization conventions
Treaties concluded in 1999
Treaties entered into force in 2000
Treaties of Afghanistan
Treaties of Albania
Treaties of Algeria
Treaties of Angola
Treaties of Antigua and Barbuda
Treaties of Argentina
Treaties of Armenia
Treaties of Australia
Treaties of Austria
Treaties of Azerbaijan
Treaties of the Bahamas
Treaties of Bahrain
Treaties of Bangladesh
Treaties of Barbados
Treaties of Belarus
Treaties of Belgium
Treaties of Belize
Treaties of Benin
Treaties of Bolivia
Treaties of Bosnia and Herzegovina
Treaties of Botswana
Treaties of Brazil
Treaties of Brunei
Treaties of Bulgaria
Treaties of Burkina Faso
Treaties of Myanmar
Treaties of Burundi
Treaties of Cambodia
Treaties of Cameroon
Treaties of Canada
Treaties of Cape Verde
Treaties of the Central African Republic
Treaties of Chad
Treaties of Chile
Treaties of the People's Republic of China
Treaties of Colombia
Treaties of the Comoros
Treaties of the Democratic Republic of the Congo
Treaties of the Republic of the Congo
Treaties of the Cook Islands
Treaties of Costa Rica
Treaties of Ivory Coast
Treaties of Croatia
Treaties of Cuba
Treaties of Cyprus
Treaties of the Czech Republic
Treaties of Denmark
Treaties of Djibouti
Treaties of Dominica
Treaties of the Dominican Republic
Treaties of East Timor
Treaties of Ecuador
Treaties of Egypt
Treaties of El Salvador
Treaties of Equatorial Guinea
Treaties of Eritrea
Treaties of Estonia
Treaties of Ethiopia
Treaties of Fiji
Treaties of Finland
Treaties of France
Treaties of Gabon
Treaties of the Gambia
Treaties of Georgia (country)
Treaties of Germany
Treaties of Ghana
Treaties of Greece
Treaties of Grenada
Treaties of Guatemala
Treaties of Guinea
Treaties of Guinea-Bissau
Treaties of Haiti
Treaties of Honduras
Treaties of Hungary
Treaties of Iceland
Treaties of India
Treaties of Indonesia
Treaties of Iran
Treaties of Ba'athist Iraq
Treaties of Ireland
Treaties of Israel
Treaties of Italy
Treaties of Jamaica
Treaties of Japan
Treaties of Jordan
Treaties of Kazakhstan
Treaties of Kenya
Treaties of Kiribati
Treaties of South Korea
Treaties of Kuwait
Treaties of Kyrgyzstan
Treaties of Laos
Treaties of Latvia
Treaties of Lebanon
Treaties of Lesotho
Treaties of Liberia
Treaties of the Libyan Arab Jamahiriya
Treaties of Lithuania
Treaties of Luxembourg
Treaties of North Macedonia
Treaties of Madagascar
Treaties of Malawi
Treaties of Malaysia
Treaties of the Maldives
Treaties of Mali
Treaties of Malta
Treaties of the Marshall Islands
Treaties of Mauritania
Treaties of Mauritius
Treaties of Mexico
Treaties of Moldova
Treaties of Mongolia
Treaties of Montenegro
Treaties of Morocco
Treaties of Mozambique
Treaties of Namibia
Treaties of Nepal
Treaties of the Netherlands
Treaties of New Zealand
Treaties of Nicaragua
Treaties of Niger
Treaties of Nigeria
Treaties of Norway
Treaties of Oman
Treaties of Pakistan
Treaties of Palau
Treaties of Panama
Treaties of Papua New Guinea
Treaties of Paraguay
Treaties of Peru
Treaties of the Philippines
Treaties of Poland
Treaties of Portugal
Treaties of Qatar
Treaties of Romania
Treaties of Rwanda
Treaties of Saint Kitts and Nevis
Treaties of Saint Lucia
Treaties of Saint Vincent and the Grenadines
Treaties of Samoa
Treaties of San Marino
Treaties of São Tomé and Príncipe
Treaties of Saudi Arabia
Treaties of Senegal
Treaties of Serbia and Montenegro
Treaties of Seychelles
Treaties of Sierra Leone
Treaties of Singapore
Treaties of Slovakia
Treaties of Slovenia
Treaties of the Solomon Islands
Treaties of Somalia
Treaties of South Africa
Treaties of South Sudan
Treaties of Russia
Treaties of Spain
Treaties of Sri Lanka
Treaties of the Republic of the Sudan (1985–2011)
Treaties of Suriname
Treaties of Eswatini
Treaties of Sweden
Treaties of Switzerland
Treaties of Syria
Treaties of Tajikistan
Treaties of Thailand
Treaties of Togo
Treaties of Trinidad and Tobago
Treaties of Tunisia
Treaties of Turkey
Treaties of Turkmenistan
Treaties of Tuvalu
Treaties of Uganda
Treaties of Ukraine
Treaties of the United Arab Emirates
Treaties of the United Kingdom
Treaties of the United States
Treaties of Uruguay
Treaties of Uzbekistan
Treaties of Vanuatu
Treaties of Venezuela
Treaties of Vietnam
Treaties of Yemen
Treaties of Zambia
Treaties of Zimbabwe
Treaties of Tanzania
Treaties extended to the Falkland Islands
Treaties extended to Guernsey
Treaties extended to Aruba
Treaties extended to Hong Kong
Treaties extended to Macau
1999 in labor relations